Gatchalian is a Filipino surname (origin Gat Salian or Gatsalian ie Don Salian, a Tagalog chief) that may refer to the following people:
C. E. Gatchalian (born 1974), Canadian playwright
Rex Gatchalian (born 1979), Filipino politician
Win Gatchalian (born 1974), Filipino politician and businessman, brother of Rex